SSSH may refer to:

 Taipei Municipal Song Shan Senior High School, a high school in Taipei, Taiwan
 Union of Autonomous Trade Unions of Croatia, a trade union in Croatia